Alex Almoukov (born ) is an Australian biathlete. He remains to be the most successful biathlete in Australia

He competed in the 2010 Winter Olympics for Australia at 18 years of age. He competed in the individual, as well as the sprint.

As of March 2013, his best Biathlon World Cup finish is 33rd, in the individual competition at Sochi in 2012/13.

He won a silver medal in the pursuit event at the World Universiade, Trentino 2013.

He competed in the 2014 Winter Olympics for Australia. Placed 45th in the 20 km individual which is the best result in Australian history for a male Biathlete.

References

External links
 
 
 

1990 births
Living people
Sportspeople from Sydney
Biathletes at the 2010 Winter Olympics
Biathletes at the 2014 Winter Olympics
Australian male biathletes
Olympic biathletes of Australia
Universiade medalists in biathlon
Universiade silver medalists for Australia
Competitors at the 2013 Winter Universiade
Sportsmen from New South Wales